The Auckland Region is New Zealand's most populous territorial authority and Auckland its most populous city. In the 2018 census, 1,571,718 persons declared themselves as residents of the region – an increase of 156,178 people or 11.0% since the 2013 census. The Auckland Region accounts for about one-third (33.4%) of New Zealand's population. Auckland has a large multicultural mix, including the largest Polynesian population in the world.

While having strong natural population growth, Auckland also has significant external (from overseas) immigration partially offset by internal (within New Zealand) emigration. During the decade up to 2011, approximately 50 people per day moved to Auckland, requiring an average of 21 new homes, and occupying in excess of one extra hectare of land.

Ethnicity

Tāmaki Māori, the group of Māori iwi that are indigenous to Auckland, include Ngāti Pāoa, Ngāi Tai, Te Wai-o-Hua, Ngāti Te Ata and Te Kawerau-a-Maki, and the Ngāti Whatua hapu (sub-tribe) of Ngāti Whātua-o-Ōrākei. Auckland also has a large urban Māori population.

The proportion of Asians and other non-European immigrants has increased during the last decades due to immigration, and the removal of restrictions directly or indirectly based on ethnicity. Immigration to New Zealand is heavily concentrated towards Auckland (partly for job market reasons). This strong focus on Auckland has led the immigration services to award extra points towards immigration visa requirements for people intending to move to other parts of New Zealand.

The following table shows the ethnic profile of Auckland's population, as recorded in the 2006, 2013 and 2018 New Zealand censuses. The substantial percentage drop of 'Europeans' in 2006 was mainly caused by the increasing numbers of people from this group choosing to define themselves as 'New Zealanders', as a result of a media campaign that encouraged people to give the response 'New Zealander' even though this was not one of the groups listed on the census form. In the 2013 census fewer Europeans identify themselves as 'New Zealander', leading to a significant increase of numbers in 'Europeans'.

Country of birth

Religion

Future growth

Auckland is expecting substantial population growth via immigration and natural population increases (which contribute to growth at about one-third and two-thirds, respectively), and is set to grow to an estimated 2 million inhabitants by 2050 (a compounded annual growth rate of 1.2% vs the 2013 number above). This substantial increase in population will have a major impact on transport, housing and other infrastructure that is in many cases already considered under pressure. It is also feared by some organisations, such as the Auckland Regional Council, that urban sprawl will result from the growth and, as a result, that it is necessary to address this proactively in planning policy.

A 'Regional Growth Strategy' has been adopted that sees limits on further subdivision and intensification of existing use as its main sustainability measures. This policy is contentious, as it naturally limits the uses of private land, especially the subdivision of urban fringe properties, by setting 'Metropolitan Urban Limits' in planning documents like the District Plan.
According to the 2006 Census projections, the medium-variant scenario shows that the population is projected to continue growing, to reach 1.93 million by 2031. The high-variant scenario shows the region's population growing to over two million by 2031.

References

Auckland
Geography of Auckland
Auckland